Jonathan Leathers (born November 5, 1985) is an American retired soccer player.

Career

Highschool
Leathers played recreation department league soccer while attending Prince Avenue Christian.

College and amateur
Leathers played college soccer at Furman University from 2004 to 2007, and was a three-time All-Conference first team player and a one-time second team All-American during his collegiate career. He was named Furman Male Athlete of the Year as a senior. During his college years, he also played with Augusta FireBall and Atlanta Silverbacks U23's in the Premier Development League.

Professional
Leathers was drafted 25th overall by Kansas City Wizards in the 2008 MLS SuperDraft and made his MLS debut in Kansas City's first match of the 2008 season against D.C. United on March 29, 2008. He was selected by expansion team Vancouver Whitecaps FC in the 8th round of the 2010 MLS Expansion Draft.

He remained with Vancouver for the 2011 season. At season's end, his contract expired and he entered the 2011 MLS Re-Entry Draft. Leathers was not selected in the draft and became a free agent.

Leathers returned to the game after a two-year break when he signed with USL club Charlotte Eagles.

International
Leathers made two appearances for the US U-23 national team at the 2008 Toulon Tournament.

Coaching 

Leathers coaches with CoachUp, a private coaching service.

References

External links
 

1985 births
Living people
American soccer players
Augusta FireBall players
Atlanta Silverbacks U23's players
Sporting Kansas City players
Sportspeople from Athens, Georgia
Vancouver Whitecaps FC players
Charlotte Eagles players
Furman Paladins men's soccer players
USL League Two players
Major League Soccer players
USL Championship players
Expatriate soccer players in Canada
United States men's under-23 international soccer players
Sporting Kansas City draft picks
Soccer players from Georgia (U.S. state)
Association football defenders